Mind of a Genius Records is an independent record label founded by David Dann. Originating in 2013, the US/UK based label has released music that ranges from electronic, hip-hop & R&B. The label boasts a diverse & notable roster that includes ZHU, Gallant, THEY., and more.

History 
Mind of a Genius Records is an independent record label founded by David Dann." The label's vision is to "create an environment in which artists could express themselves in their purest form possible". A vision that emphasized signing artists across all genres. The label's first signee was dance/electronic juggernaut, ZHU.

Following the massive success of ZHU, the label sought after R&B talent, Gallant as the next big signee. On June 30, 2015, Gallant's single "Weight in Gold" became one of the first tracks to premiere on Zane Lowe's "World Record" Beats 1 show. After signing Gallant, the label signed THEY., an enigmatic R&B duo consisting of Dante Jones & Drew Love.  Seeking international appeal, the label then signed rising Dutch band, Klangstof.

As of today, there are eight total artists under the record label. Artists record in-house at Mind of a Genius Studios,  alongside the label headquarters in Culver City, CA.

Reception 
Mind of a Genius Records has been lauded by media outlets for having a progressive outlook on label-artist relationships. The label prides itself on artists having "no contact with anyone in the label offices until an album is finished". This progressive philosophy has garnered much publicity over the years:

 Complex Magazine - "A few blocks north from Apple Music's headquarters in Culver City, Los Angeles, there's another music company quietly masterminding one of the most essential and future-formed independent labels out right now." 
 HYPEBEAST- "MOAG is an example of talent and artist ingenuity falling into the right hands."  
 NME- "The burgeoning Los Angeles songwriting powerhouse, record label and all-encompassing creative collective." 
 REVOLT- "Following in the footsteps of the iconic XL Recordings, Mind of a Genius Music Group aims to bring back the true artistry and musicianship back to the forefront of music."

Artists 

 Gallant - an American singer-songwriter from Columbia, Maryland who released his GRAMMY® nominated album Ology under the label in 2016. In 2019, Gallant released his second debut album, Sweet Insomnia.
 Klangstof- a Dutch alternative act who released their warm, synth-led EP titled Everest under the label in 2017. In 2017, they became the first Dutch band to play at Coachella. Also, the recipient of the award for "Best Alternative Act" at the Edison Awards.
 THEY.- an enigmatic R&B duo based in Los Angeles who are known for their critically acclaimed EP, Nü Religion. In 2015, the duo collaborated with fellow Mind of a Genius signee, ZHU & EDM superstar Skrillex on the commercially successful hit "Working for It". The song has reached 150 million plus streams. Since then, the duo have released an LP titled Nü Religion: Hyena,  an extension of their successful EP.
 ZHU- an Asian-American singer/producer from San Francisco, California who is best known for his GRAMMY® nominated hit, Faded that peaked at No. 12 on the Billboard US Dance/Electronic chart. In 2016, ZHU released his debut album GENERATIONWHY  that reached No. 1 on Billboard's Dance/Electronic Chart. In 2018, ZHU collaborated with Tame Impala for the viral hit, My Life. The song has recorded over 20 million streams and reached No. 1 on Spotify's Global Viral 50. In 2019, ZHU returned with his album Ringos Desert. The album instantly hit #1 on iTunes Electronic Albums Chart and garnered over 150 million streams since its release. 
 Mindchatter- a producer from New York City, Mindchatter has garnered quick recognition for his genre-defying electronic sound. He has earned praise from Pete Tong, a premier British disc jockey for BBC Radio 1.
 Karnaval Blues- a British producer known for his soul-bearing lyrics and atmospheric production, Karnaval Blues released his debut EP, You Come With the Rain in late 2019.
 KWAYE- a Zimbabwean singer/songwriter based in Los Angeles, California, is Mind of a Genius' first UK-signee. His songs have appeared in Netflix' series Topboy and On My Block. His breakout single titled "Cool Kids" was released in 2017 alongside his debut EP, Solar. 
 Peter $un- an eclectic artist from Richmond, VA, Peter $un is a rapper whose catalog consists of a feel-good fusion of rap, jazz and electronica. On August 20, 2020, Peter $un released a new single titled "100 Proof" featuring Guapdad 4000.

Discography 

 ZHU- Nightday EP (2014)                                             
 ZHU- Genesis Series (2015)                                          
 THEY.- Nü Religion EP (2015)                                          
 Gallant- Ology (2016)                                                      
 Klangstof- Close Eyes to Exit (2016)                              
 ZHU- GENERATIONWHY (2016)                       
 Klangstof- Everest EP (2017)
 KWAYE- Solar EP (2017)
 KWAYE- Love & Affliction (2018)
 ZHU- Ringos Desert (2018)
 THEY.- Fireside EP (2018)
 Klangstof- The Noise You Make Is Silent (2019)
 Karnaval Blues- You Come With the Rain (2019)
 Gallant- Sweet Insomnia (2019)

References 

Independent record labels
American record labels
British record labels
Hip hop record labels
Electronic music record labels
Contemporary R&B record labels